There have been three Keith Baronetcies.

The Keith Baronetcy was created in the Baronetage of Nova Scotia on 28 May 1625 for William Keith, 6th Earl Marischal. He had already succeeded to the title of Earl Marischal in 1623 on the death of his father George Keith, 5th Earl Marischal. The Keith Baronetcy remained merged with the earldom until its forfeiture in 1716 by George Keith, 10th Earl Marischal, for his support for the Jacobite rising of 1715.

The Keith Baronetcy, of Ludquharn, was created in the Baronetage of Nova Scotia on 28 July 1629 for William Keith. It became dormant on the death of the fifth baronet in 1771.

The Keith Baronetcy, of Powburn in the County of Kincardine, was created in the Baronetage of Nova Scotia on 4 June 1663 for James (or George) Keith. It became either extinct or dormant on his death sometime after 1663.

Keith baronets (1625) 
See Earl Marischal

Keith baronets, of Ludquharn (1629)
Sir William Keith, 1st Baronet (1629–)
Sir Alexander Keith, 2nd Baronet (–)
Sir William Keith, 3rd Baronet (–)
Sir William Keith, 4th Baronet (–1749)
Sir Robert Keith, 5th Baronet (1749–1771)

Keith baronets, of Powburn (1663)
Sir James (or George) Keith, 1st Baronet (1663-)

Keith baronets, of Ravelston and Dunottar
Sir Alexander Keith FRSE FSA (d.1819) co-founder of the Royal Society of Edinburgh after whom the Keith Medal is named
Sir Alexander Keith FRSE (d.1832)

References
 

Forfeited baronetcies
Dormant baronetcies in the Baronetage of Nova Scotia
1663 establishments in Nova Scotia